Nell Hall Williams (born 1933) is an American artist associated with the Gee's Bend group of quilters. Her work is included in the collection of the Virginia Museum of Fine Arts.

References

1933 births
20th-century American women artists
20th-century American artists
Quilters
Artists from Alabama
Living people
21st-century American women